Caridina fernandoi is a freshwater shrimp endemic to Sri Lanka, often found in lowland reservoir, slow flowing rivers and streams.

References

Atyidae
Freshwater crustaceans of Asia
Crustaceans described in 1962